Down Town Live is a live album of the Welsh rock band Man. The album was recorded at the Downtown Blues Club in Hamburg on 23 May 2001. According to the manband-archive, the recording was originally not intended for the general public. But after several months Hans-Werner Altrichter persuaded the band that "It was great music, and deserved its place in the pantheon of the performing arts", so the album was released on 7 November 2002.

The recording does not feature the full band line-up at that time, as keyboard player, Gareth Llewelyn Thorrington, had been held up at the airport because of a bomb scare.

Track listing
 "The Ride and the View" (Leonard)
 "Love Isn't Love" (Ace, Jones, Leonard, Ryan)
 "C'mon" (Jones, Ryan, Williams, John)
 "Hanging' On" (Ace, Jones, Leonard, Ryan)
 "Conflict of Interest" (Ace, Jones, Leonard, Ryan)
 "Popemobile" (Ace, Jones, Leonard, Ryan)

Personnel
 Micky Jones - guitar and vocals
 Deke Leonard - guitar, piano and vocals
 Martin Ace - bass guitar and vocals
 Bob Richards - drums

References

2002 live albums
Man (band) live albums